The 1993 La Flèche Wallonne was the 57th edition of La Flèche Wallonne cycle race and was held on 14 April 1993. The race started in Spa and finished in Huy. The race was won by Maurizio Fondriest of the Lampre team.

General classification

References

1993 in road cycling
1993
1993 in Belgian sport